Castagno d'Andrea is a frazione of the comune of San Godenzo, in the Metropolitan City of Florence, Tuscany (Italy). It is located within the Foreste Casentinesi, Monte Falterona, Campigna National Park.

It was the birthplace of the painter Andrea del Castagno.

Cities and towns in Tuscany